The Decorah crater, also called the Decorah impact structure, is a possible impact crater located on the east side of the city of Decorah in Iowa, United States.

Description 

The crater is estimated to be  in diameter, covered by the Winneshiek Shale. The impact event, equivalent to 1,000 megatons of TNT, did not appear to penetrate the Earth's mantle, but it did push down the underlying Ordovician and Cambrian bedrock several hundred feet. It may be one of several Middle Ordovician meteors that fell roughly simultaneously 469 million years ago, part of a proposed Ordovician meteor event, including three confirmed impact craters: Rock Elm crater in Wisconsin, Slate Islands crater in Lake Superior, and  Ames crater in Oklahoma.

Pentecopterus decorahensis
The Middle Ordovician (Darriwilian) Winneshiek Lagerstätte sediments that filled in the crater contained a wide variety of unusual fauna. Among them was a newly discovered species of eurypterid, Pentecopterus decorahensis. Pentecopterus was scorpion-like in appearance, and the largest predator known from that time, measuring nearly 6 feet in length. Its species name was derived from "Decorah."

See also 
 List of possible impact structures on Earth

References 

Geology of Iowa
Impact craters of the United States
Landforms of Iowa
Landforms of Winneshiek County, Iowa
Ordovician impact craters
Possible impact craters on Earth